Lomela Airport  is an airport serving  Lomela, a village in Sankuru Province, Democratic Republic of the Congo.

See also

Transport in the Democratic Republic of the Congo
List of airports in the Democratic Republic of the Congo

References

External links
OpenStreetMap - Lomela
OurAirports - Lomela
Google Maps - Lomela
FallingRain - Lomela Airport

Airports in Sankuru